Stir Crazy is a 1980 American comedy film directed by Sidney Poitier, produced by Hannah Weinstein and written by Bruce Jay Friedman. The film stars Gene Wilder and Richard Pryor as two unemployed friends who are given 125-year prison sentences after getting framed for a bank robbery. While in prison they befriend other prison inmates. The film reunited Wilder and Pryor, who had appeared previously in the 1976 comedy thriller film Silver Streak. The film was released in the United States on December 12, 1980 to mixed critical reviews, but was a major financial success.

Plot 
Aspiring actor Harry Monroe (Pryor) is working as a waiter in a rich woman's penthouse, but is fired when the cooks accidentally use his stash of marijuana as oregano at a dinner party. His friend, playwright Skip Donahue (Wilder), is working as a shop detective when he thinks he sees a well-known actress shoplifting, and his accusation gets him fired. Skip, the optimist of the two, spins their shared unemployment positively and convinces Harry that they should travel to California. They leave New York City in a battered Dodge camper-van, taking odd jobs along the way.

In Arizona, Skip and Harry perform a song and dance routine dressed as woodpeckers as part of a promotion for a bank. While the duo are on a break, two other men steal the costumes and rob the bank. However, Harry and Skip are arrested and convicted of the crime, and given 125-year jail sentences. Their court-appointed lawyer, Len Garber, advises them to wait until he can appeal their case.

The two are transferred to a maximum-security prison. After a failed attempt at faking insanity, they make friends with Jesus Ramirez, a bank robber, and Rory Schultebrand, an overtly gay man who killed his stepfather. After three months, Skip and Harry visit Warden Walter Beatty and Deputy Warden Ward Wilson, the head guard, to perform a "test" on a mechanical bull. To everyone's surprise, Skip is able to ride the bull at full power, so Beatty selects him to compete in the prison's annual rodeo competition.

Jesus and Rory inform Harry and Skip that the rodeo is a crooked operation run by Beatty and Warden Henry Sampson, who heads the neighboring prison. The money from the rodeo, which is supposed to go to the prisoners, ends up in the wardens' pockets. Realizing Skip will be selected as the prison's new champion, Jesus and Rory hatch a plan for escape involving Skip refusing to participate until the warden provides concessions. They warn Skip that he will be tortured by the warden first. Skip, however, has a blasé attitude towards everything the guards throw at him, including a week in the "hot box" and forcing him and Harry to share a cell with hulking, seemingly-mute serial killer Grossberger.

Harry and Skip are visited by Garber, who introduces them to his law partner, his cousin Meredith, to whom Skip is immediately attracted. Later, Skip meets with Beatty to make a deal: In exchange for his participation in the rodeo, Skip requests his own crew (Harry, Jesus, Rory and Grossberger), along with a shared cell for the five of them. Beatty agrees, later ordering Wilson to have a guard watch them at all times. Wilson reveals to his esteemed colleague, former rodeo champion Jack Graham, that Skip will not leave the rodeo alive.

While practicing for the rodeo, Skip, Harry, Jesus, Rory, and Grossberger acquire tools they need for their escape, while Meredith gets a job as a waitress in a country western strip club searching for possible suspects and encounters the real bank robbers. At the stadium where the rodeo is being held, each member of Skip's team but Grossberger retreats through a secret path, taking them through air vents to be met by either Jesus' wife or brother. Once through, they put on their disguises and re-enter the grounds as audience members.

Skip competes against rival champion Caesar Geronimo to swipe the prize: a bag of money from the horns of a large, Brahman bull. Skip suggests that they give the money to the prisoners, and offers to help Caesar win if he agrees to do so. Caesar wins, and throws the bag to the inmates, while Skip escapes and joins his friends.

At a secret meeting spot, Jesus and Rory bid Harry and Skip farewell as they leave for Mexico. Harry and Skip get in their car, but are intercepted by Garber and Meredith. She tells Harry and Skip that the police have collared the real crooks, and Harry and Skip intend to resume their original idea of going to Hollywood. Skip asks Meredith to go with him, and she agrees to it.

Cast 

 Gene Wilder as Skip Donahue
 Richard Pryor as Harry Monroe
 Georg Stanford Brown as Rory Schultebrand
 JoBeth Williams as Meredith
 Miguel Ángel Suárez as Jesus Ramirez
 Craig T. Nelson as Deputy Warden Ward Wilson
 Barry Corbin as Warden Walter Beatty
 Charles Weldon as Blade
 Nicolas Coster as Warden Henry Sampson
 Joel Brooks as Len Garber
 Jonathan Banks as Jack Graham
 Erland Van Lidth as Grossberger
 Lewis Van Bergen as Guard #1
 Franklyn Ajaye as Young Man in Hospital
 Cedrick Hardman as Big Mean
 Luis Ávalos as Chico
 Esther Sutherland as Sissie
 Pamela Poitier as Mavis
 Claudia Cron as Joy
 Grand L. Bush as Slowpoke
 Alvin Ing as Doctor
 Herbert Hirschman as Man at Dinner Party
 Mickey Jones as Guard #8
 Billy Beck as Flycatching Prisoner
 Lee Purcell as Susan

Production 
The film was shot in Manhattan, New York; Burbank, California; St. George, Utah Florence and Tucson, Arizona in 56 days from March 13 to May 23, 1980.

With Stir Crazy, Pryor became the first black actor to earn a million dollars for a single film.

Reception

Box office 
The film was a box office success, setting a record opening week for Columbia Pictures of $12,972,131 and then setting a studio record $15,336,245 the following week, including a studio record single day gross of $3,237,279. It went on to gross $101,300,000, being the third-highest-grossing film of 1980, behind The Empire Strikes Back and 9 to 5. It was Columbia's third film to gross $100 million and third highest-grossing film of all time, after Close Encounters of the Third Kind and Kramer vs. Kramer. The box office total marked the first time a film directed by an African-American earned more than $100 million.

Critical response
On Rotten Tomatoes, Stir Crazy has an approval rating of 69% based on 16 reviews. On Metacritic it has a score of 56% based on reviews from 6 critics.

Roger Ebert gave the film two stars out of four and wrote that it "starts strong", but "once Wilder and Pryor are thrown into prison, it seems to lose its way" as "the movie gets bogged down in developing its own plot. That is not always the best thing for a comedy to do, because if we're not laughing, it hardly matters what happens to the plot." Vincent Canby of The New York Times panned the film as "a prison comedy of quite stunning humorlessness" which "appears to have been improvised, badly, more often than written." Kevin Thomas of the Los Angeles Times wrote, "Sidney Poitier has directed Stir Crazy as if it were as much fun as his previous comedies—e.g., Uptown Saturday Night. But no amount of bouncy good-naturedness can disguise the stretched-thin quality of the material." Gene Siskel of the Chicago Tribune was positive, giving the film three stars out of four and writing, "There are explosively funny moments in this prison comedy that wouldn't be there without Pryor, who radiates a comic energy in a scene even when he's merely standing still." Variety wrote, "The extensive comic talents of Richard Pryor take a below average film like Stir Crazy and make it into an often funny and saleable picture." Gary Arnold of The Washington Post also liked the film, stating that it "blends several inventive, high-spirited performing talents into a tangy, cheerful entertainment." David Ansen of Newsweek found the film "only intermittently funny", remarking that writer Bruce Jay Friedman is "trying for a formula film and can't land on the right formula. Is it a buddy movie, a caper comedy, a parody of prison films, an urban-cowboy neo-Western, a New York vs. Sun Belt comedy? Unfortunately it's more of a shambles than any of the above, albeit a fairly genial one."

The film was nominated for a Razzie Award for Worst Supporting Actress for Georg Stanford Brown in drag.

Television series
CBS adapted Stir Crazy as a television series as part of its 1985 fall lineup. This version starred Larry Riley as Harry Fletcher and Joseph Guzaldo as Skip Harrington, who were wrongfully convicted and sentenced to 132 years in prison. While working on a chain gang, they escape and set out after Crawford (Marc Silver), the man who had actually committed the crime for which they had been sentenced.

None of the people involved in the film had a major role in this series. It was pulled from the CBS fall lineup in October 1985, the month after its premiere, and put on hiatus. It returned in a new time slot in December 1985 and a few more episodes were aired, also to low ratings. The program was permanently cancelled after the January 7, 1986 broadcast.

See also 
 Gene Wilder filmography
 List of American films of 1980

References

External links 

 
 
 
 
 

1980 films
1980 comedy films
1980s buddy comedy films
1980s crime comedy films
1980s prison films
African-American comedy films
American buddy comedy films
Films about miscarriage of justice
American crime comedy films
American prison comedy films
Columbia Pictures films
1980s English-language films
Films adapted into television shows
Films directed by Sidney Poitier
Films scored by Tom Scott
Films set in Arizona
Films set in California
Films set in Manhattan
Films set in New York City
Films set in prison
Films shot in Arizona
Films shot in California
Films shot in New York City
Films shot in Utah
Films about prison escapes
Films with screenplays by Bruce Jay Friedman
1980s American films